Jessica Reyez (born June 12, 1991) is a Canadian singer and songwriter. Her 2016 single "Figures" peaked at number 58 on the Canadian Hot 100 in 2017 and was certified triple Platinum by Music Canada and Platinum by the RIAA. Her 2017 EP, Kiddo, led to four nominations at the 2018 Juno Awards, winning Breakthrough Artist. Her follow up EP, Being Human in Public, was released in 2018. It won R&B/Soul Recording of the Year at the 2019 Juno Awards and was nominated for Best Urban Contemporary Album at the 2020 Grammy Awards. Reyez again won the R&B/Soul Recording of the Year, for "Feel it Too" with Tory Lanez and Tainy, at the 2020 Juno Awards, where she was also nominated for Artist of the Year. Reyez has written songs for Calvin Harris, Kehlani, Dua Lipa and Normani, most notably penning the hit "One Kiss", and has collaborated with Eminem on multiple occasions. Her debut album, Before Love Came to Kill Us, was released on March 27, 2020, to widespread critical acclaim, and saw commercial success, entering at number thirteen on the US Billboard 200.

Early life
Jessica Reyez was born in the Jane and Finch area of Toronto, Ontario to Colombian parents.  She was introduced to the guitar by her father, leading to a career in art and music. She played guitar as a child and began writing her own music in high school. Jessie and her family then moved to Brampton. After graduating, she opted out of college and instead chose to pursue her music while doing odd jobs on the side. In 2012, Reyez and her family moved to Florida, where she was primarily bartending and busking on the beach, but she returned to Toronto in 2014 after being accepted to The Remix Project's Academy of Recording Arts. At the Remix Project, Reyez was mentored by Daniel Daley, from Dvsn, and her music was heard by King Louie.

Career

Early career and Kiddo (2014–2017)  
In 2014, Reyez and King Louie released a joint single titled "Living in the Sky", followed by a second single, "It Hurts (Selena)", in 2015. In early 2017, she released the single "Shutter Island" and toured Europe opening for PartyNextDoor. Her follow-up single, "Figures", was premiered by Zane Lowe on Beats 1 radio, alongside its music video. "Figures" peaked at number 58 on the Canadian Hot 100 in 2017 and was certified triple platinum by Music Canada.

In April 2017, Reyez released her debut EP, Kiddo as well as her short film Gatekeeper, which addressed sexism and exploitation in the music industry. It specifically was based on her experience with music producer Noel "Detail" Fisher, who was accused of sexual misconduct by multiple women, including artist Bebe Rexha. Kiddo peaked at number 83 on the Canadian Album Chart.

Kiddo was placed on the Long List of the 2017 Polaris Music Prize and lead to four nominations at the 2018 Juno Awards (R&B/Soul Recording of the Year, Breakthrough Artist, Video of the Year, and Juno Fan Choice Award), where she won Breakthrough Artist. She also received two 2017 iHeartRadio Much Music Video Awards nominations for Best New Canadian Artist and Fan Fave Video for "Shutter Island". She was also nominated for two 2018 MTV Music Video Awards, including Push Artist of the Year and Video With A Message (for "Gatekeeper"). Reyez performed "Figures" at the 2017 BET Awards on June 25, 2017 and on The Tonight Show Starring Jimmy Fallon on August 8, 2017. Later in 2017, she signed a record and publishing deal with Island Records.

Being Human in Public (2018–2019) 
Billboard named Reyez one of the "10 Hip-Hop and R&B Artists to Watch in 2018". She also received a SOCAN Songwriting Prize nomination for the song "Cotton Candy". Reyez released her second EP, Being Human in Public, and toured across North America. The EP won 2019's R&B/Soul Recording of The Year at the 2019 Juno Awards and was nominated for Best Urban Contemporary Album at the 2020 Grammy Awards. It also appeared on the short list for the 2019 Polaris Music Prize.

In August, Reyez collaborated with Eminem on "Nice Guy" and "Good Guy", from the album Kamikaze, both charting on the Billboard Hot 100 and appeared on the soundtrack to Fifty Shades Freed. On April 9, 2019, Reyez released the single "Imported" featuring 6lack, a re-working of a song off her last EP. The single was later certified Gold by both the RIAA and Music Canada. She also had a cameo in the Netflix film, Someone Great and appeared on The Lion King: The Gift, performing (with 070 Shake) and co-writing the song "Scar".

Before Love Came to Kill Us (2020–2022) 
Reyez received her first Grammy nomination, when Being Human in Public was nominated for Best Urban Contemporary Album at the 2020 Grammy Awards. Reyez opened for Billie Eilish on her Where Do We Go? world tour, with some of the dates postponed due to COVID-19 pandemic. She was also booked to perform for the first time at Coachella festival, which was also postponed due to the pandemic.

Reyez released her debut studio album, Before Love Came to Kill Us, on March 27, 2020. The album includes collaborations with Eminem and 6lack, with the deluxe edition including additional features from Rico Nasty, Melii, JID, and A Boogie wit da Hoodie. The album was preceded by the single "Love in the Dark" and also included previous singles "Figures" and "Imported". Before Love Came to Kill Us debuted at #13 on the Billboard 200 and was short-listed for the 2020 Polaris Music Prize.

Reyez was nominated for two awards at the 2020 Juno Awards: Artist of the Year and R&B/Soul Recording of the Year (for "Feel It Too" with Tory Lanez and Tainy), winning the latter award. The music video for Reyez's song "Far Away" won the 2020 Prism Prize, with director Peter Huang winning the $20,000 award. Reyez was featured in Beyoncé's musical film Black Is King, which premiered on Disney+ in July 2020.

She received nominations for five awards at the 2021 Juno Awards: Artist of the Year, Songwriter of the Year, and R&B/Soul Recording of the Year (for Before Love Came to Kill Us), with two of her music videos nominated Video of the Year. "No One's in the Room" which was directed by Emma Higgins, ended up taking the prize.

Yessie (2022–present) 
Reyez released her second studio album, Yessie, on September 16, 2022. The album consists of 11 tracks, featuring one collaboration with former collaborator 6lack on the song "Forever".

Discography

Studio albums
Before Love Came to Kill Us (2020)
Yessie (2022)

Tours
Headlining
 The Kiddo Tour (2018)
 Being Human in Public Tour (2019)
 Before Love Came to Kill us Tour (2020)
 Yessie Tour (2022–23)

Supporting
 PartyNextDoor – European Tour (2014)
 Halsey - Hopeless Fountain Kingdom Tour (2018)
 Billie Eilish – Where Do We Go? World Tour (2020)
 Jessie only played at 2 shows in Florida due to the COVID-19 pandemic. 
 Billie Eilish – Happier Than Ever, The World Tour (2022)
 Sam Smith - Gloria the Tour (2023)

Awards and nominations

References

External links

1991 births
Living people
Canadian women singer-songwriters
Canadian singer-songwriters
Canadian pop singers
Canadian people of Colombian descent
Musicians from Toronto
Juno Award for Breakthrough Artist of the Year winners
Canadian contemporary R&B singers
Canadian soul singers
21st-century Canadian women singers
Juno Award for R&B/Soul Recording of the Year winners
Spanish-language singers of Canada
Canadian hip hop singers